MasterMinds is an academic quiz bowl program active in Upstate New York. There are currently four regions with associated leagues: Albany, Rochester, Syracuse, and Buffalo. Some games in the Albany and Rochester regions are broadcast on public-access television.

History 
MasterMinds was founded by CYPRAS in 1993. The first season consisted of schools in the Rochester area. MasterMinds later expanded to schools in Buffalo (1995), Albany (1999), and Syracuse (2003).

Rules

General
Masterminds uses NAQT questions. Two teams of up to four players face off answering questions on a wide variety of topics including literature, history, science, visual and auditory arts, philosophy, social science, geography, current events, and popular culture. Each team appoints a captain, denoted by a star on their nameplate. The captain will be preferred in bonus questions, and if there is conflict will be used to clarify. All players are provided with pens and a half sheet of paper for scratch work for math questions.

Length
Games consist of two eight-minute timed halves. If a tossup question or set of bonuses is in progress at the end of a half, that round of questioning will be allowed to finished, if attempts at stalling are witness by the adjudicator the game may be nullified and the stalling team disqualified. Starting in 2020, games have consisted of two halves with eight questions each, and no set timer. If there is a tie by the end of the 16 questions, more will be read until one team gains or loses points.

Toss-Up Questions
Toss-Up questions are worth 10 points.  They are asked, and any one person from either team can buzz in and give the answer. If they get the question correct, they earn 10 points for their team which then has the opportunity to answer a set of bonus questions.  If a player interrupts the question and supplies an incorrect answer, that player's team may not answer the question again. The opposing team may wait until the question finishes to answer. There is a certain point in each tossup question, typically just before an import clue, called the "power mark". If a player rings in on a toss-up before the "power mark" and answers correctly, they earn 15 points instead of 10. If, however, a player answers incorrectly before the question is over, their team is deducted 5 points. Players may not confer with their teammates during toss-up questions by verbal or nonverbal means. After ringing in to answer a question, players must wait for the adjudicator to verbally recognize them by saying their name and school. If a player does not wait to be recognized, it is treated as an incorrect answer, and the normal procedure for incorrect answers applies.

Bonus Questions
Following a correct answer to a toss-up question, a team is entitled to a set of three bonus questions centered around a single topic. Each question is worth 10 points, for a total of 30 points. Conferring is allowed and encouraged. Any person from the team may answer a bonus question, however if there are multiple contradicting answers, the adjudicator will ask the captain for a single answer.

Format

Regular season
During the Regular Season, the teams in each region are divided up into leagues. Most leagues have six teams, though some have five or up to nine. In the 2018-19 season, Albany had six leagues, Buffalo had five leagues, Rochester had ten, and Syracuse had two. The leagues are run with a double or triple round robin format, depending on the number of teams. All teams play twelve regular season games across six rotations, meaning that teams usually play two games each rotation, though they may play more if they were unable to go to an earlier one. There is generally one rotation each month, and they are held at schools in the league. Individual statistics, such as the number of questions answered correctly, the number answered incorrectly, the number of power marks or penalties earned, the number of games and halves played, and the player's average points per half, are kept.

Many participating schools also have Junior Varsity teams, which are ostensibly for students in 10th grade and below. There are generally fewer Junior Varsity teams in each league than Varsity teams, so their tournaments are often quadruple or hextuple round robin. Junior Varsity games are run on the same questions as those for the Varsity division. There are no playoffs for Junior Varsity.

Playoffs
The top half of Varsity teams (rounded up) by win–loss record from each league advance to the regional playoffs. The playoffs are run with a double elimination format. The playoffs for Albany, Buffalo, and Rochester are spread across multiple days, beginning in mid-to-late April and ending in late May. In the Albany and Buffalo playoffs, the teams that qualified for playoffs are separated into two groups, each of which plays the first four rounds of playoffs, and the teams that remain after those games (two undefeated and four once-defeated) play again at a later date to decide the regional champion. The Rochester league is similar, except that initially the teams are divided into four, and the final match takes place at a date after its competitors are determined, due to fact that there are many more teams in Rochester than in Albany or Buffalo. Correspondingly, Syracuse, the smallest region, concludes its playoffs on a single day. Individual stats are not kept in the playoffs, though an MVP and "All Tournament Team" are stated, presumably on the basis of total points obtained.

The winner of each of the Regional Championships advance to the State Championship in June. The State Championships usually take place at Le Moyne College. The State Championships are run in a round robin format: each team plays each other once, and a champion is decided based on win–loss record. Like in the regional playoffs, individual stats are not kept, but an MVP and "All Tournament Team" are named. The questions used in the regional and state playoffs are of the same difficulty as those used in the regular season.

State Champions and Regional Winners
The first state tournament occurred in 2006.

References

External links
MasterMinds Official Website
Student quiz television series
American public access television shows
Television game shows with incorrect disambiguation